The music featured in the American musical drama television series The Get Down consists of a soundtrack by various artists and an original score composed by Elliott Wheeler.

Official soundtrack 
The official soundtrack of The Get Down includes original songs from the series, cover versions and several songs from the 1960s and 1970s, with a principal focus on disco, R&B, funk, and soul. Likewise the TV series, it was released in two parts.

The Get Down 

The Get Down (Original Soundtrack from the Netflix Original Series) is the official soundtrack for the first part of The Get Down featuring various artists, released by RCA Records on August 12, 2016.

The Get Down: Part II 
The Get Down: Part II (Original Soundtrack from the Netflix Original Series) is the official soundtrack for the second part of The Get Down featuring various artists, released by RCA Records on April 21, 2017.

Official score 
The Get Down (Score Soundtrack from the Netflix Original Series) is the official score for both the first and the second part of The Get Down featuring original orchestral music and vocal performances, released by RCA Records on September 8, 2017. The score of the series was composed by Elliott Wheeler.

Featured music 
This is a list of non−original songs that are featured in the series but not in the official soundtrack.

Episode 1: "Where There Is Ruin, There Is Hope for a Treasure" 
 The Spinners  – The Rubberband Man
 Earth, Wind & Fire  – Shining Star
 Can − Vitamin C (2004 Remastered)
 Little Beaver  – Concrete Jungle
 Salsoul Orchestra  – Magic Bird of Fire
 The Trammps  – Disco Inferno
 Wild Cherry  – Play That Funky Music
 Earth, Wind & Fire  – Be Ever Wonderful
 Boney M.  – Daddy Cool
 Murray Head  – Superstar
 Fatback Band  – (Are You Ready) Do the Bus Stop
 C.J. & Co.  – Devil’s Gun
 The New Swing Sextet – Revolucionando
 Incredible Bongo Band  – Apache (Grandmaster Flash Remix)
 Eastside Connection  – Frisco Disco Rhythm Heritage  – Theme song from the TV show S.W.A.T. Billy Squier  – The Big Beat Michael Kiwanuka  – Rule the World Vicki Sue Robinson  – Turn the Beat Around Episode 2: "Seek Those Who Fan Your Flames" 
 La Lupe  – El Carbonero Hot Chocolate  – Heaven Is the Back Seat of My Cadillac Henry Mancini  – The Pink Panther Theme Willie Colon  – El Malo Lyn Collins  – Think (About It) Marvin Gaye  – Mercy Mercy Me (The Ecology)  Nina Simone  – Don’t Explain Commodores  – The Assembly Line Gloria Gaynor  – Never Can Say Goodbye Curtis Mayfield  – Superfly Orquesta Harlow, Larry Harlow, Junior Gonzalez  – La Cartera The Jimmy Castor Bunch  – It’s Just Begun Aretha Franklin  – Rock Steady Machine  – There But for the Grace of God Go I Episode 3: "Darkness Is Your Candle" 
 KC and the Sunshine Band  – That’s the Way (I Like It) George McCrae  – Rock Your Baby The Temptations  – Papa Was a Rollin' Stone The Rolling Stones  – Hot Stuff Marvin Gaye  – Got to Give it Up, Pt. 1 Dynamic Corvettes  – Funky Music Is The Thing (Parts 1 & 2) Pleasure  – Let’s Dance Chic  – Dance, Dance, Dance (Yowsah, Yowsah, Yowsah) Quincy Jones  – Money Runner Joe Tex  – I Gotcha Chocolate Milk  – Action Speaks Louder Than Words Kool & the Gang  – Hollywood Swinging Trio los Panchos  – Besame Mucho The Supremes  – Up the Ladder To The Roof (covered on the soundtrack)

 Episode 4: "Forget Safety, Be Notorious" 
 Leon Bridges  – Ball of Confusion (That's What the World Is Today) José Feliciano  – Susie Q Willie Colón  – Juana Pena Tito Puente Y Su Orquesta − Cuando Calienta el Sol Stevie Wonder  – Living for the City Musique  – In the Bush Teddy Pendergrass  – You Can’t Hide From Yourself (covered on the soundtrack)
 Babe Ruth  – The Mexican The Jackson 5  – Hum Along and Dance CAN − Vitamin C Episode 5: "You Have Wings, Learn to Fly" 
 James Brown – Give It Up or Turnit a Loose
 Baby Huey & the Babysitters – Listen to Me
 The Jackson 5 – The Love You Save
 War – Slippin' into Darkness

Episode 6: "Raise Your Words, Not Your Voice" 
 Village People  – In Hollywood (Everybody is a Star)
 Marie et les Garçons − Rien à dire
 The Emotions  – Best of My Love
 First Choice  – Doctor Love
 Walter Murphy  – A Fifth of Beethoven
 Lucy Hawkins  – Gotta Get Out of Here
 John Williams & London Symphony Orchestra  – Star Wars Main Title / Rebel Blockade Runner

Episode 7: "Unfold Your Own Myth" 
 ABBA  – Money, Money, Money (mixed with The Get Down lyrics)
 Bee Gees  – Stayin' Alive
 Chuck Brown & the Soul Searchers  – Bustin' Loose
 Joel Grey and Liza Minnelli  – Money Money
 Dyke & the Blazers  – Let a Woman Be a Woman
 Earth, Wind & Fire  – September
 The Isley Brothers  – Fight the Power (Part 1 & 2)
 The O'Jays  – For the Love of Money
 Blondie  – One Way or Another
 The Honey Drippers  – Impeach the President
 John Legend feat. Chance the Rapper  – Penthouse Floor

References

Television soundtracks